La Vie, l’Amour, la Mort is a film directed by Claude Lelouch in 1968 (released in France in 1969).

Synopsis
François Toledo, a married businessman and father, falls head-over-heels in love with Janine, a colleague. 
However, after three dates, he feels dishonoured when he suffers from impotence. In frustration, he strangles some prostitutes before being  arrested. He is tried and convicted, and sentenced to death on the guillotine.

Starring
Amidou : François Toledo
Caroline Cellier : Caroline
Janine Magnan : Janine
Marcel Bozzuffi
Pierre Zimmer
Pierre Collet
"El Cordobés"
Annie Girardot
Jacques Henry
Robert Hossein
Catherine Samie : Julie

Awards
Best Actor at the Rio Festival for Amidou

References

External links
 

French drama films
1969 films
Films directed by Claude Lelouch
Films about capital punishment
Films scored by Francis Lai
1960s French films